Shelby Township is one of fourteen townships in Shelby County, Indiana. As of the 2010 census, its population was 1,892 and it contained 771 housing units.

Shelby Township was organized in 1882. This township was named for the county in which it is located.

Geography

Unincorporated towns
 Fenns
 Prescott
 Wilson Corner

References

External links
 Indiana Township Association
 United Township Association of Indiana

Townships in Shelby County, Indiana
Townships in Indiana